Pseudodeltote formosana is a species of moth of the family Noctuidae first described by George Hampson in 1910. It is found in Taiwan.

The length of the forewings is 12–14 mm. The forewings are dark brown suffused with olive green and the hindwings are white, sparsely sprinkled with dark brown.

References

Moths described in 1910
Acontiinae